Roar of the Press is a 1941 American comedy-drama crime film directed by Phil Rosen and starring Jean Parker and Wallace Ford.

Plot
Married only a few hours, small-town girl Alice makes her first visit to New York with new husband Wally Williams, a hotshot reporter for the Globe.

A body falls from a building. Williams steals the identification and calls in the story to city editor MacEwen, who makes Wally follow it up. Reporters' wives warn Alice to expect this kind of thing.

A personal ad leads Wally to a second corpse. The police read about in the Globe and angrily haul Wally in for questioning. Alice's irritation grows, as does that of reporters from other newspapers at Wally's continued scoops.

Evildoers from an anti-American organization kidnap Wally, and when he won't reveal how he gets his information, they grab Alice as well. Sparrow McGraun runs a numbers racket but likes Wally better than these foreigners, so he saves the newlyweds. A grateful Wally gives this scoop to every paper except the Globe.

Cast
 Jean Parker as Alice Williams
 Wallace Ford as Wally Williams
 Jed Prouty as Gordon MacEwan
 Suzanne Kaaren as Angela Brooks
 Harland Tucker as Harry Brooks
 Evalyn Knapp as Evelyn
 Robert Frazer as Louis Detmar
 Dorothy Lee as Frances Harris
 John Holland as Robert Mallon
 Maxine Leslie as Mrs. Mabel Leslie
 Paul Fix as 'Sparrow' McGraun
 Betty Compson as Mrs. Thelma Tate
 Matty Fain as Nick Paul
 Eddie Foster as Fingers
 Charles King as Police Lieutenant Homer Thomas
 Frank O'Connor as Police Lieutenant Jim Hall
 Dennis Moore as Henchman Toughy
 Robert Pittard as Tommy

See also
 List of American films of 1941
 List of films in the public domain in the United States

External links

1941 films
American black-and-white films
1941 drama films
Films about journalists
Monogram Pictures films
Films directed by Phil Rosen
American drama films
1940s English-language films
1940s American films